The South Norfolk Railway was incorporated in 1886, to construct a railway from Simcoe, Ontario to Port Rowan, Ontario.

Summary
In 1887, the station was acquired by Grand Trunk Railway and was absorbed into their railway network.

Simcoe was already connected to the railway system by other railways. The South Norfolk Railway had intermediate stations at Vittoria, Walsh and Forestville. The proximity of Walsh's railway station to Young's Creek brought extra economical advantages to flour and lumber mills operating in the region. The level of industrialization that the South Norfolk Railway brought to Norfolk County would be impossible to replicate today because of the emphasis of railway services on established urban links instead of trying to expand to rural areas that desperately need railway travel.

A lawsuit was initiated in 1888 between the Port Rowan and Lake Shore Railway and the South Norfolk Railway.

The railway was eventually run by Canadian National Railway, which closed the line in 1965. Workers from the CNR would eventually remove the railroad tracks; thus reverting it to private property status.

References

Defunct Ontario railways
Grand Trunk Railway subsidiaries
Canadian National Railway subsidiaries
1886 establishments in Ontario
1965 disestablishments in Ontario
Rail transport in Norfolk County, Ontario
History of Norfolk County, Ontario
Canadian companies established in 1886
Standard gauge railways in Canada